Cinemasonic is a live album by All About Eve.  It was released both as a CD and as a DVD and is a recording of the band's gig on 31 May 2002 at the Shepherd's Bush Empire.

Track listing (CD)
 "Let Me Go Home" (Andy Cousin, Julianne Regan) – 3:56
 "The Dreamer" (Cousin, Rod Price, Regan, Marty Willson-Piper) – 3:45
 "Somebody Said" (Rik Carter, Cousin, Regan) – 4:27
 "Blue Sonic Boy" (Tim McTighe, Regan) – 6:09
 "Daisychains" (Carter, Cousin, Regan) – 6:01
 "I Don't Know" (Cousin, Regan) – 4:25
 "Phased" (Cousin, Price, Regan, Willson-Piper) – 4:32
 "Ctrl-Alt-Delete" (Carter, Cousin, Regan) – 4:06
 "Sodium" (Cousin, Regan) – 4:43
 "Touched by Jesus" (Cousin, Price, Regan, Willson-Piper) – 10:16
 "Life on Mars?" (David Bowie) – 5:03

Track listing (DVD)

As well as a video recording of the concert, the DVD also contains a mini-feature called "Access all Areas", which is a fifteen-minute backstage look at the concert and the tour as a whole.

  "Let Me Go Home"
  "The Dreamer"
  "Flowers in Our Hair"
  "In the Clouds"
  "Somebody Said"
  "Blue Sonic Boy"
  "Daisychains"
  "I Don't Know"
  "Phased"
 "Ctrl-Alt-Delete"
 "Sodium"
 "Wishing the Hours Away"
 "Make it Bleed"
 "Outshine the Sun"
 "Every Angel"
 "Life on Mars?"
 "Our Summer"
 "Touched by Jesus"

Personnel 

Julianne Regan - vocals
Andy Cousin - bass guitar
Toni Haimi - lead guitar
Rik Carter - keyboards and guitars
Del Hood - drums

All About Eve (band) live albums
2003 live albums
2003 video albums
Live video albums